The 2011 All-Africa Games football – Men's tournament was the 10th edition of the African Games men's football tournament for men. The football tournament was held in Maputo, Mozambique between 4–17 September 2011 as part of the 2011 All-Africa Games. The tournament was age-restricted and open to men's under-23 national teams.

Qualified teams

Notes 
Note 2: Withdrew.

Squads

Final tournament
The draw for the men's final tournament took place in Cairo, Egypt on July 12 in CAF headquarters. The six teams were divided into two groups of three teams. The two top teams from each group played the semifinals before the final match.

Group winners and runners-up will advanced to semifinals.

All times given as local time (UTC+2)

Group stage

Group A

Group B

Knockout stage

Semifinals

Bronze Medal match

Gold Medal match

Final ranking

Goalscorers

4 goal
  Mahatma Otoo

1 goal

  Douglas Djika
  Jacques Nguemaleu
  Prince Baffoe
  Gilbert Fiamenyo
  Artur Fait
  Maninho
  Jonas Tomocene
  Manuel Uetimane
  Aliou Coly
  Dame Diop
  Emmanuel Gomis
  Riaan Eugene
  Sibusiso Khumalo
  Thamsanqa Sangweni
  Thabang Motau
  Fisimpilo Ntombela
  Ibrahim Juma

See also
Football at the 2011 All-Africa Games – Women's tournament

References

External links
 All Africa Games at CAFonline.com

Tournament